is a large (2500 students) private school in Moto-kita-kata (本北方), Ichikawa, Chiba, Japan. The school is sometimes mistaken for a public school due to its name: Ichikawa Junior High School, Ichikawa High School or Ichikawa for short. The private school is managed by the Ichikawa Gakuen School Corporation.

History
In 1937, Yonekichi Koga (古賀米吉 Koga Yonekichi) opened the school in Yawata-aza-shinden (currently known as Higashi-sugano 4-chome), Ichikawa, Chiba. That was the beginning of Ichikawa Gakuen. The school had only male students since after the last war; however, the school became coeducational when the school moved to its present location in the spring of 2003.

The school has relationships with John McGlashan College in Dunedin, New Zealand, as well as others in Shanghai, China, the Philippines and Nanaimo, British Columbia, Canada.

Famous alumni
Hideki Takahashi - actor
Kenta Satoi - actor
Keisuke Onishi - founder and CEO (Navitime Japan)
Ikuo Suhoh - CEO (Burning Productions)
Tatsuo Kawamura - founder and chairman (K-Dash)
Takeshi Ebihara - cartoonist
Hirotami Murakoshi - DPJ member of the House of Representatives of Japan

Other
The school also manages three kindergartens in the Ichikawa area.

Gallery

External links

 Ichikawa Gakuen Website 

Private schools in Japan
Educational institutions established in 1937
Education in Chiba Prefecture
1937 establishments in Japan